The women's 200 metre freestyle competition of the swimming events at the 2019 Pan American Games was held on 7 August 2019 at the Villa Deportiva Nacional Videna cluster.

Records
Prior to this competition, the existing world and Pan American Games records were as follows:

Results

Heats
The first round was held on August 7.

Final B
The B final was also held on August 7.

Final A
The A final was also held on August 7.

References

Swimming at the 2019 Pan American Games
2019 in women's swimming